John Ribton Gore  (3 November 1820 - 20 November 1894) was an Anglican priest in Ireland in the nineteenth century.

Gore was born in County Cavan and educated at Trinity College, Dublin. He was ordained in 1851 and was for many years the incumbent at Dromard. He was Archdeacon of Achonry from 1883 until his death.

His son was a noted astomoner.

References

1894 deaths
Alumni of Trinity College Dublin
Archdeacons of Achonry
1820 births
People from County Cavan